Lapland Odyssey is a 2010 Finnish comedy film directed by Dome Karukoski. The film stars Jussi Vatanen, Jasper Pääkkönen, Timo Lavikainen, Pamela Tola, Kari Ketonen and Miia Nuutila. The film premiered at the 2010 Toronto International Film Festival.

Cast

Plot
After a man called Janne living in Lapland in Northern Finland fails to acquire a digital television adapter for his wife from the local utility store due to not reaching it before closure time, he sets out with his two friends in the middle of the night to get one by any means necessary. He sets up a late rendezvous with his father-in-law who owns an electronics store in Rovaniemi, several hundred kilometers away. Naturally nothing is ever simple and along the way, the trio end up having several comedic misadventures.

Awards and nominations
Alpe d'Huez International Comedy Film Festival

|-
| 2011|| Lapland Odyssey || Grand Prix || 
|-
| 2011|| Lapland Odyssey || Coup de cœur || 
|}

Festróia - Tróia International Film Festival

|-
| 2011|| Pini Hellstedt (Best Cinematography) ||Silver Dolphin || 
|-
| 2011|| Lapland Odyssey (Best Film) ||Golden Dolphin || 
|}

Irish Film and Television Awards

|-
| 2011|| Lance Hogan (Best Original Score) ||IFTA Award || 
|}
The film also won four Jussi Awards and was nominated in three categories.

References

External links 
  
 
 
 

2010 films
2010s comedy road movies
Finnish comedy films
2010s Finnish-language films
Films directed by Dome Karukoski
2010 comedy films